Sannantha virgata is a flowering shrub species in the myrtle family, Myrtaceae. It is endemic to New Caledonia. Plants grow to between 0.5 and 3 metres high. White flowers appear in spring or summer with 5 rounded petals surrounding 7 to 10 stamens. The fruits are 1–2 mm wide and 2–3 mm in length.

Taxonomy
The species was first formally described in 1775 as Leptospermum virgatum. In 1810 it was placed in the genus Baeckea. By 1997 an Australian  Baeckea virgata species complex had been identified which was regarded as separate from the New Caledonian population. From this complex, 8 separate species were identified and placed in the genus Babingtonia. In 2007, the species were placed in the newly created genus Sannantha and assigned the following names:
 
Sannantha angusta (A.R.Bean) Peter G.Wilson
Sannantha bidwillii (A.R.Bean) Peter G.Wilson
Sannantha brachypoda (A.R.Bean) Peter G.Wilson
Sannantha collina (A.R.Bean) Peter G.Wilson
Sannantha crassa (A.R.Bean) Peter G.Wilson
Sannantha papillosa (A.R.Bean) Peter G.Wilson
Sannantha pluriflora (F.Muell.) Peter G.Wilson
Sannantha similis (A.R.Bean) Peter G.Wilson

References

Endemic flora of New Caledonia
virgata
Taxa named by Johann Reinhold Forster
Taxa named by Georg Forster